The following highways are numbered 314:

Canada
 Manitoba Provincial Road 314
 Prince Edward Island Route 314

China
 China National Highway 314

Costa Rica
 National Route 314

India
 National Highway 314 (India)

Japan
 Japan National Route 314

United States
  Arkansas Highway 314
  Connecticut Route 314
  Florida State Road 314 (former)
  Georgia State Route 314
  Iowa Highway 314 (former)
  Louisiana Highway 314
  Maryland Route 314
  Mississippi Highway 314
  Montana Secondary Highway 314
  New Mexico State Road 314
  New York State Route 314
 New York State Route 314 (former)
  Ohio State Route 314
  Pennsylvania Route 314
  South Carolina Highway 314
  South Dakota Highway 314
  Tennessee State Route 314
 Texas:
  Texas State Highway 314 (former)
  Farm to Market Road 314
  Utah State Route 314
  Vermont Route 314
  Virginia State Route 314
 Virginia State Route 314 (former)
  Wyoming Highway 314

Other areas:
  Puerto Rico Highway 314
  U.S. Virgin Islands Highway 314